Norwalk is a city in Los Angeles County, California, United States. The population was 105,549 at the 2010 census and an estimated 103,949 in 2019. It is the 58th most densely-populated city in California.

Founded in the late 19th century, Norwalk was incorporated as a city in 1957.

Norwalk is a member of the Gateway Cities Council of Governments. Norwalk's sister cities are Morelia in the Mexican state of Michoacán, and Hermosillo, in the Mexican state of Sonora.

History

The area known as "Norwalk" was first home to the Shoshonean Native American tribe. They survived primarily on honey, an array of berries, acorns, sage, squirrels, rabbits and birds. Their huts were part of the Sejat Indian village.

In the late 1760s, settlers and missions flourished under Spanish rule with the famous El Camino Real trail traversing the area. Manuel Nieto, a Spanish soldier, received a Spanish land grant (Rancho Los Nietos) in 1784 that included Norwalk.

After the Mexican–American War in 1848, the Rancho and mining days ended. Portions of the land were subdivided and made available for sale when California was admitted into the union of the United States. Word of this land development reached the Sproul Brothers in Oregon. They recalled the fertile land and huge sycamore trees they saw during an earlier visit to the Southern California area. In 1869, Atwood Sproul, on behalf of his brother, Gilbert, purchased  of land at $11 an acre ($2,700/km2) in an area known as Corazón de los Valles, or "Heart of the Valleys".

By 1873, railroads were being built in the area and the Sprouls deeded , stipulating a "passenger stop" clause in the deed. Three days after the Anaheim Branch Railroad crossed the "North-walk" for the first time, Gilbert Sproul surveyed a town site. In 1874, the name was recorded officially as Norwalk. While a majority of the Norwalk countryside remained undeveloped during the 1880s, the Norwalk Station allowed potential residents the opportunity to visit the "country" from across the nation.

The families referred to as the "first families" of Norwalk (including the Sprouls, the Dewitts, the Settles, and the Orrs) settled in the area in the years before 1900. D.D. Johnston pioneered the first school system in Norwalk in 1880. Johnston was also responsible for the first real industry in town, a cheese factory, by furnishing Tom Lumbard with the money in 1882. Norwalk's prosperity was evident in the 1890s with the construction of a number of fine homes that were located in the middle of orchards, farms and dairies. Headstones for these families can be found at Little Lake Cemetery, which was founded in 1843 on the border between Norwalk and Santa Fe Springs at Lakeland Road.

At the turn of the 19th century, Norwalk had become established as a dairy center. Of the 50 local families reported in the 1900 census, most were associated with farming or with the dairy industry. Norwalk was also the home of some of the largest sugar beet farms in all of Southern California during this era. Many of the dairy farmers who settled in Norwalk during the early part of the 20th century were Dutch.

After the 1950s, the Hispanic population in Norwalk grew significantly as the area became increasingly residential.

Airplane disaster
In February 1958, two military aircraft, a Douglas C-118A military transport and a U.S. Navy P2V-5F Neptune patrol bomber, collided over Norwalk at night. Forty-seven servicemen were killed, as was a civilian 23-year-old woman on the ground who was hit by falling debris. A plaque commemorating the disaster and erected by the American Legion in 1961 marks the spot of the accident, today a mini-mall at the corner of Firestone Boulevard and Pioneer Boulevard.

The Hargitt House
Built in 1891 by the D.D. Johnston family, the Hargitt House was built in the architectural style of Victorian Eastlake. The Hargitt House Museum, located at 12426 Mapledale, was donated to the people of Norwalk by Charles ("Chun") and Ida Hargitt.

Geography
Norwalk is located at  (33.906914, -118.083398).

Norwalk is bordered by Downey to the northwest, Bellflower to the southwest, Cerritos and Artesia to the south, and Santa Fe Springs and Whittier to the north and east.

Demographics

67.7% of persons age 5 years+, 2014-2018 live in a home where another language than English is spoken.

2010
The 2010 United States Census reported that Norwalk had a population of 105,549. The racial makeup of Norwalk was 52,089 (49.4%) White (12.3% Non-Hispanic White), 4,593 (4.4%) African American, 1,213 (1.1%) Native American, 12,700 (12.0%) Asian (5.3% Filipino, 2.5% Korean, 0.9% Chinese, 0.8% Indian, 0.8% Vietnamese, 0.6% Cambodian, 0.3% Thai, 0.3% Japanese), 431 (0.4%) Pacific Islander, 29,954 (28.4%) from other races, and 4,569 (4.3%) from two or more races. Hispanic or Latino of any race were 74,041 persons (70.1%)

The Census reported that 103,934 people (98.5% of the population) lived in households, 315 (0.3%) lived in non-institutionalized group quarters, and 1,300 (1.2%) were institutionalized.

There were 27,130 households, out of which 13,678 (50.4%) had children under the age of 18 living in them, 15,190 (56.0%) were opposite-sex married couples living together, 5,045 (18.6%) had a female householder with no husband present, 2,348 (8.7%) had a male householder with no wife present.  There were 1,712 (6.3%) unmarried opposite-sex partnerships, and 178 (0.7%) same-sex married couples or partnerships. 3,417 households (12.6%) were made up of individuals, and 1,631 (6.0%) had someone living alone who was 65 years of age or older. The average household size was 3.83.  There were 22,583 families (83.2% of all households); the average family size was 4.10.

The population was spread out, with 29,164 people (27.6%) under the age of 18, 12,026 people (11.4%) aged 18 to 24, 30,138 people (28.6%) aged 25 to 44, 23,790 people (22.5%) aged 45 to 64, and 10,431 people (9.9%) who were 65 years of age or older. The median age was 32.5 years. For every 100 females, there were 98.5 males. For every 100 females age 18 and over, there were 95.3 males.

The homeowner vacancy rate was 1.4%; the rental vacancy rate was 3.8%.  70,180 people (66.5% of the population) lived in owner-occupied housing units and 33,754 people (32.0%) lived in rental housing units.

During 2009–2013, Norwalk had a median household income of $60,770, with 12.9% of the population living below the federal poverty line.

2000
As of the census of 2000, there were 103,298 people, 26,887 households, and 22,531 families residing in the city. The population density was 10,667.6 inhabitants per square mile (4,120.2/km2). The racial makeup of the city was 44.82% White, 4.62% African American, 1.16% Native American, 11.54% Asian, 0.39% Pacific Islander, 32.75% from other races, and 4.71% from two or more races. Hispanic or Latino of any race were 62.89% of the population.

There were 26,887 households, out of which 46.6% had children under the age of 18 living with them, 60.1% were married couples living together, 16.6% had a female householder with no husband present, and 16.2% were non-families. 12.7% of all households were made up of individuals, and 5.8% had someone living alone who was 65 years of age or older. The average household size was 3.79 and the average family size was 4.08.

In the city, the population was spread out, with 32.1% under the age of 18, 10.7% from 18 to 24, 30.5% from 25 to 44, 17.6% from 45 to 64, and 9.0% who were 65 years of age or older. The median age was 30 years. For every 100 females, there were 97.9 males. For every 100 females age 18 and over, there were 94.3 males.

The median income for a household in the city was $46,047, and the median income for a family was $47,524. Males had a median income of $31,579 versus $26,047 for females. The per capita income for the city was $14,022. About 9.5% of families and 11.9% of the population were below the poverty line, including 14.8% of those under age 18 and 7.6% of those age 65 or over.

Government and infrastructure

City government

Norwalk operates under a Council/Manager form of government, established by the Charter of the City of Norwalk which was drafted in 1957. The five-member City Council acts as the city's chief policy-making body. Every two years, Council members are elected by the citizens of Norwalk to serve four-year, overlapping terms. Council members are not limited to the number of terms they may serve. The Mayor is selected by the Council and serves a one-year term.

According to the city's most recent Comprehensive Annual Financial Report, the city's various funds had $78.2 million in Revenues, $79.1 million in Expenditures, $107.2 million in Total Assets, $48.7 million in Total Liabilities, and $54.8 million in Cash and Investments.

The structure of the management and coordination of city services is:

Public safety

Norwalk is a contract city, in which the Los Angeles County Sheriff's Department provides police services. It maintains its own station, which also provides police services to La Mirada and unincorporated South Whittier. At one time the station also provided contracted police services to Santa Fe Springs, but those services ended when the city entered into a contract with the Whittier Police Department. The station is staffed with 206 sworn personnel.

Fire protection in Norwalk is provided by the Los Angeles County Fire Department with ambulance transport by Care Ambulance Service.

Registrar/recorder
Norwalk is the home of the Los Angeles County Registrar/Recorder. The Los Angeles County Registrar's Office is responsible for the registration of voters, maintenance of voter files, conduct of federal, state, local and special elections and the verification of initiative, referendum and recall petitions. There are approximately 4.1 million registered voters, and 5 thousand voting precincts established for countywide elections. The office also has jurisdiction over marriage license issuance, the performance of civil marriage ceremonies, fictitious business name filings and indexing, qualification and registration of notaries and miscellaneous statutory issuance of oaths and filings. The office issues approximately 75,000 marriage licenses and processes 125,000 fictitious business name filings annually. The Recorder's Office is responsible for recording legal documents which determine ownership of real property and maintains files of birth, death and marriage records for Los Angeles County. It serves the public and other County departments such as the Assessor, Health Services, Public Social Services and Regional Planning. The office processes 2 million real and personal property documents and 750,000 birth, death and marriage records annually and services approximately 2,000 customers daily.

County, state, and federal representation
In the Los Angeles County Board of Supervisors, Norwalk is in the Fourth District, represented by Janice Hahn.

The Los Angeles County Department of Health Services operates the Whittier Health Center in Whittier, serving Norwalk.

The United States Postal Service operates the Norwalk Post Office at 14011 Clarkdale Avenue and the Paddison Square Post Office at 12415 Norwalk Boulevard.

Superior Court
The Southeast District of the Los Angeles County Superior Court is located in Norwalk.

Metropolitan State Hospital

The  Metropolitan State Hospital, a psychiatric and mental health facility operated by the California Department of State Hospitals, is located in Norwalk. It has four different types of categories for patient intake. The four categories being; incompetent to stand trial (PC 1370), offender with a mental health disorder (PCS 2962/2972), not guilty by reason of insanity (PC 1026), and conservatorship lanterman-petris-short (LPS) Act.

Transportation

Freeways
Three freeways travel through the city. The Santa Ana Freeway (I-5) and San Gabriel River Freeway (I-605) pass through and intersect just above its northern edge, while the Century Freeway (I-105) ends in Norwalk at Studebaker Road.

Norwalk Transit
Norwalk Transit serves Norwalk and its adjacent communities. Six bus lines operate in Norwalk and adjacent cities, including Artesia, Bellflower, Cerritos, La Mirada and Whittier. Norwalk Transit Buses make connections with Los Angeles Metrorail Green Line from Route 2 and Southern California Metrolink from Route 7

Long Beach Transit
Long Beach Transit provides service to the Metro Green Line Station via Studebaker Road from Long Beach.

Los Angeles Metro
The Los Angeles MTA ("Metro") provides both bus and rail service from Norwalk. The Metro C Line (formerly the Green Line) light rail provides service from the Norwalk C Line station to LAX (via shuttle from Aviation Station) and Redondo Beach. Metro bus routes provide service to the west on Florence Avenue, Firestone Boulevard, Imperial Highway, and Rosecrans Avenue from the Norwalk C Line Station. Express routes also connect to Disneyland, El Monte Bus Station, Long Beach and downtown Los Angeles.

Metrolink
The Metrolink Orange County Line and 91 Line (which operate on the same track in this area) trains connect Norwalk (the Norwalk/Santa Fe Springs station) with Orange County, Riverside County, and Downtown Los Angeles.

Economy

Top employers

According to the City's 2013 Comprehensive Annual Financial Report, the top employers in the city are:

Education
Norwalk is home to Cerritos College. The college offers degrees and certificates in 87 areas of study in nine divisions. Over 1,200 students complete their course of studies each year.

Norwalk is served by the Norwalk-La Mirada Unified School District, headquartered at 12820 Pioneer Boulevard in Norwalk, as well as the Little Lake City School District, headquartered in Santa Fe Springs. Certain areas of Norwalk are served by the ABC Unified School District, based in Cerritos, and others by the Whittier Union High School District. Among the several parochial schools in Norwalk are Saint John of God School (Roman Catholic), Pioneer Baptist School (Baptist Christian), and Saint Linus School (Roman Catholic). It also contains The California distinguished school J.B. Morrison Elementary Magnet School.

Media
KCAL-TV channel 9 was licensed to Norwalk for a year in 1989 during an ownership transfer as part of a settlement with the FCC by former owner RKO General; the one-year change in city of license was barely noted on-air (it returned to a city of license of Los Angeles in 1990), and the station never had any actual assets based in Norwalk.

Notable people

Ruth Asawa, sculptor
Shirley Babashoff, swimmer, winner of eight Olympic medals and 1975 world championship, Norwalk High School graduate, 1973
Dick Bass, born Richard Lee Bass, played professional football as running back for Los Angeles Rams from 1960 through 1969
William Conrad (1920–94), actor, director and producer in film and television; graduate of Excelsior High School
Tiffany Darwish, 1980s singer and actress
James Gattuso, analyst and pundit in Washington, D.C., who often appears on television and radio to give opinions on domestic policy; Excelsior High School Class of 1975
Keith Ginter, MLB player for Houston Astros, Milwaukee Brewers, and Oakland Athletics
Bob Kevoian, radio host, The Bob & Tom Show, Norwalk High Class of 1969
Joseph Marquez, professional Super Smash Bros. player for Cloud9, graduate of John Glenn High School class of 2010
Ron McGovney, the first bass player of Metallica
Lindsay Mendez, Broadway actress 
Alexandra Nechita, artist, considered youngest cubist ever discovered (at age 8) and nicknamed "petite Picasso"; attended Moffit Elementary School prior to her fame when she relocated outside of Norwalk
Pat Nixon (1912–93), First Lady of United States 1969–74, wife of President Richard Nixon; graduate of Excelsior High School Class of 1929 (family bought a truck farm in Dairy Valley, formerly in Artesia, now part of Cerritos)
Donald Novis, actor, died in Norwalk 1966
Rashaad Penny, running back, Seattle Seahawks
Ron Rinehart, lead singer, Dark Angel
Poncho Sanchez, Latin jazz artist
Cindy Sheehan, anti-Iraq War activist
Gene Taylor, blues-rock and boogie-woogie pianist, Norwalk High Class of 1970
Delta Work, drag queen and stylist 
Nikki Schieler Ziering, Playboy Playmate, actress and Ian Ziering's ex-wife

Neighborhoods
 Carmenita (South Norwalk)
 Civic Center (Central Norwalk)
 Norwalk Hills (North Norwalk)
 South Norwalk
 Studebaker (North Norwalk)
 Norwalk Manor (South East Norwalk)

Sports

The Falcon Field is the largest venue by capacity (12,000) in Norwalk. It is the home of the public community college football team Cerritos Falcons and a major venue for track and field events.

See also

References

External links

 
 Norwalk Chamber of Commerce
 Norwalk Municipal Code
 Norwalk QuickFacts from the US Census Bureau

 
1957 establishments in California
Cities in Los Angeles County, California
Gateway Cities
Incorporated cities and towns in California
Populated places established in 1957